Bend Or (1877–1903) was a British Thoroughbred racehorse who won the 1880 Epsom Derby. His regular jockey Fred Archer, winner of thirteen consecutive British jockey titles, said Bend Or was probably the greatest horse he had ever ridden.

Nomenclature

His name is the heraldic term for "a bend (i.e. diagonal stripe) that is golden or yellow in color (or)", and is a reference to the ancient former arms of the Grosvenor family which were adjudged against them in 1389 to the Scrope family in the most famous case ever heard before the Court of Chivalry, known as Scrope v Grosvenor. The Duke also awarded it as a lifelong family nickname to his grandson Hugh Grosvenor, 2nd Duke of Westminster (1879–1953), born in the year before the Derby win. Bendor Range is named after the horse.

Breeding
Bred and foaled at the 1st Duke of Westminster's Eaton Stud, Bend Or grew to be a large stallion but was noted for his unusual docility. He was sired by Doncaster, a son of Stockwell, out of the mare, Rouge Rose by Thormanby. Thormanby won the 1860 Epsom Derby and the 1861 Ascot Gold Cup and was in 1869 the leading sire in Great Britain & Ireland.

Racing career

1879: Two-year-old Season
Bend Or made his first racecourse appearance in July 1879 in the Chesterfield Stakes at Newmarket. Starting as the 9/4 favourite he won easily by a length. He then won the Richmond Stakes carrying a 6-pound weight penalty. After these wins he started to 1/2 favourite for the Prince of Wales Stakes at York. He led from the outset and won easily by half a length. After York he was already being quoted at 7/1 for the 1880 Epsom Derby. Bend Or finished the season by winning the Triennial Produce Stakes and the Rous Memorial Stakes, both at Newmarket.

1880:Three-year-old Season

The Derby
Bend Or was not entered for the 2000 Guineas, but in early March, he was the 5/1 favourite for The Derby. He started his three-year-old campaign in the Derby. He was ridden by Fred Archer and started as the 2/1 favourite in a field of 19. After the start, he was in a prominent position but was dropped back into mid-division by Archer. At Tattenham Corner Robert the Devil  was leading from Von der Tann, Bend Or being in about the sixth position. In the straight Bend Or passed some of the horses to move into third. The second placed Mask then began to fade as he was passed by Bend Or, who went off in pursuit of Robert the Devil. Bend Or won the Derby by a head from Robert the Devil, with Mask a further six lengths back in third.

St. James's Palace Stakes
After the Derby, he went to Royal Ascot for the St. James's Palace Stakes, starting at the odds of 30/100. The race was run at a slow early pace. Bend Or won by a head from Fernandez, the two finishing clear of the rest of the field. After Ascot he had to be given a few months rest due to shin problems exacerbated in his Derby win.

Challenge to Pedigree

In the summer a challenge was lodged by the owners of Robert the Devil against Bend Or's Derby win on the grounds of him being entered under the wrong description. It was alleged that his dam was not Rouge Rose, but a mare called Clemence. At Eaton Stud, both Rouge Rose and Clemence had a foal by Doncaster in 1877. It was suggested that the two foals had been mixed up and that it was the horse registered as Tadcaster (i.e. the Clemence foal) that won the Derby. The accusation came from a former groom who formerly worked for the Duke. During the investigation, the Eaton Stud book was produced, but was found to contain a number of errors. The objection was overruled by the Jockey Club, but controversy still remains today. Recent research which compared DNA of Bend Or to that of Tadcaster relatives suggested the two had indeed been switched as foals.

Clemence was a daughter of Newminster and Eulogy. Newminster was the son of Touchstone and Beeswing. Eulogy was the daughter of Euclid and Martha Lynn.

The Autumn
The shin injury affected him for most of the remainder of the year as was evident in his first loss when he returned to racing for September's St Leger Stakes, where he finished fifth behind winner Robert the Devil. His next start came in the Great Foal Stakes. In that race, Robert the Devil made the running, with Bend Or held up in the rear. At the bushes, Bend Or moved up to third behind Robert the Devil and Muriel. Bend Or then overtook Muriel and challenged Robert the Devil. Bend Or seemed to have the race won with 50 yards to go, but he swerved badly and lost by a head. He faced Robert the Devil again in the Champion Stakes. Robert the Devil started the 11/10 favourite, with Bend Or at 5/4. Robert the Devil led from the start and was never caught. He won by 10 lengths from Bend Or, with the other two runners a further 10 lengths back.

1881: Four-year-old Season
Returning to the track at age four, Bend Or won the City and Suburban Handicap at Epsom Downs carrying 9 stone. He then avenged his defeats to Robert the Devil in the Epsom Gold Cup. Only the two horses ran, with Bend Or winning by a neck. Bend Or then won the Champion Stakes easily by ¾ length from Scobell, with the 1881 Derby winner Iroquois a bad third. Bend Or's next start came in the Cambridgeshire Stakes where, under Archer, he carried 9 st 8 lb. During the closing stages the weight began to tell and he was eased by Archer, finishing in seventh. He was then retired to breeding duties at his owner's Eaton Stud.

Race record

Stud record
Bend Or had white flecks on his chestnut coat, and like his damsire Thormanby, had black spots on his neck, shoulder, and on his quarters. These markings often showed up in his progeny and is referred to as Bend Or spotting.

Standing at Eaton Stud, Bend Or was a successful stallion siring many top racehorses including two classic winners. His stud fee for 1898 was 200 guineas, plus one guinea for the groom. By this time his offspring had won 285 races worth £129,148

Notable progeny

c = colt, f = filly

Kendal went on to sire Triple Crown winner Galtee More. Ormonde sired dual Eclipse Stakes winner Orme. Orbit was exported to Argentina. Such was his success at stud there he was known as "South American Stockwell". Bona Vista went on to sire Ascot Gold Cup winner Cyllene. Through Cyllene's grandson Phalaris, Bend Or is the sire-line ancestor to the majority of thoroughbreds alive today. Radium sired 2000 Guineas winner Clarissimus.

Bend Or did not produce many top race mares, but many of them were top broodmares. His daughter Fairy Gold was exported to America and was the dam of Fair Play and Belmont Stakes winner Friar Rock. Another daughter Ornament was the dam of Sceptre, winner of four classics in 1902. Disorder was produced Eclipse Stakes winner Epsom Lad. Bend Or was also damsire to Prix du Jockey Club winner Ex Voto, through is daughter Golden Rod. Through his daughter Quetta, Bend Or was damsire to Coronation Stakes winner Helm and Dewhurst Stakes winner Frontier (who was sired by his grandson Orme).

Bend Or was twice the leading broodmare sire in Britain before his death at age twenty-six in January 1903. Bend Or's important immediate descendants include The Tetrarch, Phar Lap and Man o' War, and beyond that the American horse Seabiscuit.

Pedigree

Note: b. = Bay, br. = Brown, ch. = Chestnut

See also
 List of historical horses

References

External links
 Bend Or at the United Kingdom's National Horseracing Museum

1877 racehorse births
1903 racehorse deaths
Racehorses bred in the United Kingdom
Racehorses trained in the United Kingdom
British Champion Thoroughbred broodmare sires
Epsom Derby winners
Thoroughbred family 1-k